Stavrum is a surname. Notable people with the surname include:

Arild Stavrum (born 1972), Norwegian football coach and former player
Gunnar Stavrum (born 1961), Norwegian newspaper editor and author
Kjersti Løken Stavrum (born 1969), Norwegian journalist and editor
Martin Stavrum (1938–2022), Norwegian politician
Ole Erik Stavrum (born 1966), Norwegian former footballer